Paw Paw was a community in Richland Township, Miami County, in the U.S. state of Indiana.

History
Paw Paw was platted in 1847. When the Eel River Railroad was built in Miami County, it was not extended to Paw Paw, and the village became a ghost town.

A post office was established at Paw Paw in 1840, and remained in operation until it was discontinued in 1883.

Geography

References

Geography of Miami County, Indiana
Ghost towns in Indiana